Virginia University could refer to one of several universities in the Commonwealth of Virginia, a state in the southern United States:
 Virginia University of Lynchburg, a historically black university in Lynchburg
 University of Virginia, a public research university in Charlottesville

See also

 Virginia Polytechnic Institute and State University, known as Virginia Tech, a public land grant polytechnic university in Blacksburg